VA-150 has the following meanings:
Attack Squadron 150 (U.S. Navy)
State Route 150 (Virginia)